Kownatki may refer to the following places in Poland:

Kownatki, Lublin Voivodeship
Kownatki, Podlaskie Voivodeship
Kownatki-Falęcino